Eau Pleine may refer to the following locations in the U.S. state of Wisconsin:

Towns
 Eau Pleine, Marathon County, Wisconsin
 Eau Pleine, Portage County, Wisconsin

Rivers
 Big Eau Pleine River
 Little Eau Pleine River